Hana Horká (15 February 1964 – 16 January 2022) was a Czech folk singer. She was a member of the band Asonance.

Life 
Hana Horká was born in Příbram. She studied at the Brno Conservatory, and then joined the Janáček Academy of Music and Performing Arts. She also works at the National Theatre Brno. In 1985, she joined the folk group Asonance. She became one of the main voices. She recorded her last album with Asonance in 2019, "Návrat Krále" (The Return of the King).

The singer refused to be vaccinated and decided to voluntarily contaminate herself with COVID-19 in order to obtain a COVID health pass as she believed the natural immunity from COVID-19 would be able to protect her more effectively than vaccination.

Her son Jan Rek told Czech Radio that he and his father were infected before Christmas, but both were vaccinated and felt unwell for three days; Hana Horka, who got infected, was ill for five days, until she died on 16 January 2022. Her son, the day after his mother's death, stated that she was not anti-vaccination but blamed her death on the anti-vaccine movement.

References 

1964 births
2022 deaths
People from Příbram
Czech folk singers
Deaths from the COVID-19 pandemic in the Czech Republic